Prickle-like protein 4 is a protein that in humans is encoded by the PRICKLE4 gene.

References

External links

Further reading